Nefi or NEFI may refer to:

Nef'i (1572–1635), a poet of the Ottoman Empire
Nephi, a name use by several people and places in the Book of Mormon
New England Fuel Institute
New England Fertility Institute, Fertility Centers Of New England